The Mozambique Workers' Organization (Organização dos Trabalhadores de Moçambique) (OTM) is a national trade union center in Mozambique.

The OTM was formed in 1983 as a directly controlled arm of the Frelimo political party. However, in 1990 the OTM declared its independence from the party, although critics maintain that it is still close.

References

External links
 OTM webpage.

Trade unions in Mozambique
International Trade Union Confederation
National federations of trade unions
1983 establishments in Mozambique
Trade unions established in 1983